Tephronia is a genus of moths in the family Geometridae.

Species
Tephronia codetaria
Tephronia cyrnea
Tephronia espaniola
Tephronia gracilaria
Tephronia oranaria
Tephronia sepiaria
Tephronia sicula

References
Natural History Museum Lepidoptera genus database

External links
Fauna Europaea

Boarmiini